The year 1906 in archaeology involved some significant events.

Explorations
 Christiana Herringham begins copying the Ajanta Caves paintings.

Excavations

 Hugo Winckler begins excavations at Hattusa near Boğazköy in Turkey for the Deutsche Orient-Gesellschaft with Theodore Makridi which identify it as the royal capital of the Hittites (continue to 1911).
 Richard MacGillivray Dawkins begins excavations at the Sanctuary of Artemis Orthia in Sparta (continue to 1910).
 T. May begins excavations of the Principia of the Roman fort at Bremetennacum (Ribchester), Lancashire, England (continue to 1907).
 Excavations at Lisht are resumed by the Egyptian Expedition of the Metropolitan Museum of Art, New York (continue for 14 seasons to 1934).
 Approximate date – Antonios Keramopoulos begins systematic excavations of Mycenaean Thebes, Greece, starting at the Kolonaki hill (continue to 1921).

Finds
 Mummy of Senebtisi at Lisht in Egypt.

Publications
"Note sur une statuette mexicaine en wernerite représentant la déesse Ixcuina" by Ernest-Théodore Hamy in the Journal de la Société des Américanistes about the Dumbarton Oaks birthing figure.

Events
 8 June – Antiquities Act is passed by the United States Congress
 29 June – Mesa Verde, an Ancestral Puebloan site, is made a United States National Park
 September – A military balloon is flown over Stonehenge carrying out the first aerial photography in archaeology.

Births
 12 January – Eric Birley, British archaeologist associated with the excavations of forts on Hadrian's Wall (d. 1995).
 27 January – Alberto Ruz Lhuillier, Mexican archaeologist (d. 1979).
 26 June – Joan du Plat Taylor, British maritime archaeologist (d. 1983).

Deaths

References

Archaeology
Archaeology
Archaeology by year